Lucas de Valdés Carasquilla (March 1661 – 23 February 1724) was a Spanish painter and engraver of the Baroque period, active in Seville.

He was the son of Juan de Valdés Leal and Isabella Carasquilla. He was born at Seville, and at the age of eleven he engraved four plates which are to be found in Fiestas de Seville a la canonización de San Fernando and form emblematic allusions to the virtues of that Saint. He became mathematical master of the Marine College at Cádiz, but continued the exercise of the pencil and graver until his death there. He also painted pictures of Saints and portraits, several of which he engraved; among them were the portraits of Father Francisca Tamariz and of the philanthropist Manara, one of his prominent painting was the Spanish victory in the Battle of Lepanto. His son Juan was also an engraver.

Works

Other paintings

References

1661 births
1724 deaths
People from Seville
17th-century engravers
18th-century engravers
Spanish engravers
17th-century Spanish painters
Spanish male painters
18th-century Spanish painters
18th-century Spanish male artists
Spanish Baroque painters
Painters from Seville